2nd FFCC Awards 

Best Film: 
 Titanic 
The 2nd Florida Film Critics Circle Awards honoured the best in film for 1997.

Winners
Best Actor: 
Robert Duvall - The Apostle
Best Actress: 
Helen Hunt - As Good as It Gets
Best Cast: 
Boogie Nights
Best Cinematography: 
L.A. Confidential - Dante Spinotti
Best Director: 
Curtis Hanson - L.A. Confidential
Best Documentary Film:
Fast, Cheap & Out of Control
Best Film: 
Titanic
Best Foreign Language Film: 
Shall we dansu? (Shall We Dance?) • Japan
Best Newcomer: 
Ben Affleck and Matt Damon - Good Will Hunting
Best Screenplay: 
L.A. Confidential - Curtis Hanson and Brian Helgeland
Best Supporting Actor: 
Rupert Everett - My Best Friend's Wedding
Best Supporting Actress: 
Julianne Moore - Boogie Nights

1
1997 film awards